Private Parts is a 1972 American horror film directed by Paul Bartel in his feature film debut, and starring Ayn Ruymen, Lucille Benson, and John Ventantonio. Its plot follows a troubled young woman who suspects a deviant serial killer is living among her in her aunt's dilapidated hotel in downtown Los Angeles.

Plot
Cheryl Stratton gets into an argument with her roommate Judy, and decides to move out. Cheryl steals Judy's wallet and, rather than return to her native Ohio, visits the King Edward Hotel, a dilapidated hotel in downtown Los Angeles that is operated by her maternal Aunt Martha, whom she has never met. The brusque, conservative Martha allows Cheryl to temporarily stay in the King Edward, which she considers one of the "last respectable hotels in the city". Martha's central provision for Cheryl's stay is that she not wander the hotel at night. Cheryl soon notices that the guests and residents of the hotel are very unusual.

Soon after settling into her room, Cheryl senses she is being watched. Judy's boyfriend, Mike, arrives at the hotel searching for Cheryl, and is met by the Reverend Moon, an eccentric guest who dresses as a priest. Mike is attacked in an upstairs hallway by an unseen assailant, who decapitates him before throwing his corpse in the hotel furnace. Later, over dinner, Cheryl inquires about Martha's daughter; Martha states that the child was conceived via artificial insemination, and implies that she is dead.

Cheryl soon takes notice of George, a mysterious, handsome photographer who lives in the hotel, and whom Martha allows to keep a darkroom in the basement. While exploring the hotel, Cheryl realizes there are peepholes throughout, some of which allow a direct view into her room. George begins to leave sexually aggressive notes for Cheryl, which progress to gifts of lingerie which he suggest she model for him. Curious, Cheryl steals the hotel master keys and has copies made, which she uses to enter George's room. Inside, she discovers a transparent inflatable sex doll on his bed, and numerous avant-garde photos of nude women lining the walls. Judy arrives at the hotel searching for Mike and wanting to reclaim her stolen money. Martha directs her to the basement darkroom, where an unseen assailant murders her. That night, Jeff, a young man who works at the locksmith where Cheryl copied the keys, invites her on a date to a rock concert. Meanwhile, George fills his inflatable sex doll with water and affixes a blown-up headshot of Cheryl onto its face. He then draws his own blood into a hypodermic needle, before injecting the blood into the doll.

George and Martha later get into an argument in which George accuses her of ruining his life by attempting to "protect" him from slatternly women. That night, Cheryl dresses in the lingerie George left for her, and erotically undresses in the bathroom, aware George is watching her from a peephole. After she leaves her room, George enters it and takes back the lingerie, which he uses to dress his inflatable doll. Martha finds the discarded doll in the trash the next morning, and orders Cheryl to return home. Jeff arrives later for his date with Cheryl. As they head to the concert, Jeff mentions he previously dated a woman named Alice, a model who disappeared from the hotel, and mentions that she was frightened of George. Cheryl, who feels protective of George, is angered by this and aborts the date, returning to the hotel.

Jeff follows Cheryl to the hotel, and confronts George, who is in his room listening to a taped audio recording of Alice's murder. George bludgeons Jeff with a bottle and drags his body to the darkroom. When he returns to his room, he finds Cheryl posed on his bed in the lingerie. Cheryl assumes the two are going to have sex, but is horrified when George produces a hypodermic needle, which he attempts to stab her with. An altercation ensues in which Cheryl inadvertently kills him by pushing over a large stage light that falls on his head. Martha, alerted by the noise, enters the room. When she unbuttons George's shirt to feel for a heartbeat, she reveals that George has breasts, and is not a man at all, but a woman who has been cross-dressing and presenting as a male. Martha raves that George's spirit has been liberated from his body, and that she raised George—who is her biological child—as a man so that he would not be "tainted" by wanton female sexuality. Martha briefly suggests that Cheryl become her "new son", but swiftly changes her mind, attacking Cheryl with a large butcher knife.

The next day, Jeff's father arrives at the hotel with police, who recover an unconscious Jeff in the darkroom, alongside Judy's corpse. Upstairs, they discover George's body alongside Martha's, which is now dressed in Cheryl's lingerie outfit. Later, as the police depart the hotel, Cheryl emerges from upstairs in a daze, repeating to herself Martha's phrase that the King Edward is "one of the last respectable hotels in the city" and that she must be "extremely selective" about its clientele.

Cast

Cast notes:
Director Paul Bartel had an uncredited bit part as Mr. Lovejoy, a drunk who lives in the hotel.

Production
Private Parts began with the working title "Blood Relations"; the change came at the order of MGM studio head James Aubrey, but Private Parts as a title was problematic because some newspapers would not print it; in Chicago, the film was advertised as Private Arts.

Producer Gene Corman – the brother of Roger Corman – convinced MGM to allow New York City-based underground filmmaker Paul Bartel to direct his first feature-length film for them. It originally was supposed to have been directed by Andrew Davis, who remained the cinematographer when he was replaced by Bartel. Location shooting took place in the King Edward Hotel near Skid Row, Los Angeles. The screenplay by Philip Kearney and Les Rendelstein was based on real-life people they had met in Los Angeles in the 1960s. Bartel also made uncredited contributions to the screenplay.

The role of Aunt Martha, played by Lucille Benson, was intended for Mary Astor.

When the film was test-screened for audiences, the results were so bad that the studio decided to release the film under its "Premier Productions" subsidiary, along with two standard horror films; it was then shelved. Nevertheless, the film was copyrighted by MGM and not Premier Productions. Despite MGM's obvious lack of interest in promoting the property, the studio passed the opportunity to sell it to Roger Corman's New World Pictures when they expressed interest in buying it.

Response
Roger Greenspan, who reviewed the film for The New York Times on its release, wrote:

[Bartel] succeeds in some details and fails in others. But the attempt, even when it isn't quite working, is a good deal more interesting than most...Private Parts is at least a hopeful occasion for those of us who love intellectual cinema and at the same time care for the menacing staircase, for the ominous shadow, for empty rooms shuttered against the light of the afternoon...Bartel is a young director whose previous short films have shown a genius of title (Secret Cinema, Naughty Nurse) not entirely matched by their content. Private Parts is no triumph, but it does mark a giant step forward toward the successful blending of precocious perversity and satiric good sense that seems the fated direction of his career.

The film did not do well at the box office.

See also
 List of American films of 1972

References

Sources

External links
 
 
 
 
 John Landis on Private Parts at Trailers From Hell

1972 films
1972 directorial debut films
1972 horror films
1970s black comedy films
1970s comedy horror films
1970s English-language films
1970s exploitation films
1970s thriller films
American black comedy films
American comedy horror films
American exploitation films
American independent films
LGBT-related horror films
American serial killer films
Cross-dressing in film
Films directed by Paul Bartel
Films set in hotels
Films set in Los Angeles
Films shot in Los Angeles
Incest in film
Metro-Goldwyn-Mayer films
Films produced by Gene Corman
Films scored by Hugo Friedhofer
1970s American films